Hosur (also Romanized as Ḩaşūr, Hasoor, and Hoşūr) is a village in Varzaq Rural District, in the Central District of Faridan County, Isfahan Province, Iran. At the 2006 census, its population was 501, in 120 families.

References 

Populated places in Faridan County